My Man is a 1996 French drama film written and directed by Bertrand Blier. It was entered into the 46th Berlin International Film Festival where Anouk Grinberg won the Silver Bear for Best Actress.

Plot
Marie is a prostitute who enjoys her job: she likes the independence, she likes the money, and she likes pleasing men. One cold night she sees a homeless man asleep at the foot of the stairs and, struck by his plight, asks him up to her apartment. His name is Jeannot and, after she has given him food and drink, she offers herself. Realising that she has fallen in love with him, and wanting to keep him, she offers him the job of being her pimp.

Jeannot likes the independence, the money, and the sex with Marie, but is lonely mooching around town while she is entertaining clients in the apartment. Meeting a manicurist called Sanguine, he decides to make her his next prostitute. Her first client happens to be a police inspector investigating vice rings and Jeannot ends up in jail.

Marie, devastated at losing Jeannot and at his treachery, is also sorry over Sanguine's plight. She decides to give up prostitution and to raise a family with a good man. Meeting Jean-François in a bar, she decides that he will be the father and invites Sanguine to join the two of them. When Jeannot is released he meets Bérengère, who is looking for a man. Since neither Marie nor Sanguine ever visited or wrote to him, he moves into her house.

Jean-François, who has given Marie two babies and has another on the way with Sanguine, keeps getting fired and is now unemployable, being on the black list. With the electricity cut off and Sanguine due to deliver at any moment, Marie decides to go back to prostitution. But the men do not seem interested in her any more and the prices they offer are derisory. Coming home despondent, she finds a mute Jeannot at the table. While Jean-François prepares to rush Sanguine to the maternity hospital, Jeannot mutters his apologies to them all.

Cast
 Anouk Grinberg - Marie Abarth
 Gérard Lanvin - Jeannot
 Valeria Bruni Tedeschi - Sanguine
 Olivier Martinez - Jean-François
 Dominique Valadié - Gilberte
 Jacques François - 2nd Client
 Michel Galabru - 3rd Client: Armoire
 Robert Hirsch - M. Hervé
 Bernard Le Coq - Inspector Marvier
 Bernard Fresson - Personnel Director
 Jacques Gamblin - 4th Client
 Jean-Pierre Darroussin - Gilbert's Client
 Ginette Garcin - Woman In Shawl
 Dominique Lollia - Mélissa
 Frédéric Pierrot - The Cop
 Aurore Clément - Woman of the World
 Jean-Pierre Léaud - M. Claude
 Jean-Philippe Écoffey

Accolades

References

External links

1996 films
1996 drama films
French drama films
1990s French-language films
Films directed by Bertrand Blier
Films about prostitution in France
1990s French films